This article is a list of piano brand names from all over the world. This list also includes names of old instruments which are no longer in production.

Many of these piano brand names are "stencil pianos", which means that the company which owns the brand name is simply applying the name to a piano manufactured for them by another company, and that the same or very similar pianos are sold under differing "stencil" brands. This often applies to old brand names, revitalized to give an air of heritage to a new piano line, or to pianos manufactured specifically for individual dealers or shops.  Also, some brand names have models that are manufactured in entirely different manufacturing plants or countries than another model of the same brand.

At July 2020 this list had 1174 entries.

A 

 Aarhus Pianofabrik
 A.B. Chase
 Ackerman & Lowe 
 Ackerman, F.J. 
 Acoustgrand
 Acrosonic
 Adam, F.
 Adam, G.
 Adam, M.
 Adams
 Aeolian
 Aerts
 Ajello
 Albert
 Albert & Co.
 Albion
 Albrecht
 Alden
 Aldrich
 Alexander
 Alex Steinbach
 Alfred Rohr, Leipzig
 Allgäuer
 Allison
 Allmendiger
 Alois Kern
 Altenburg, Frederick
 Altenburg, Otto
 American Pianos
 American Music
 Amherst 
 Ammer
 Amphion
 American Piano Company (Ampico)
 Amyl
 Anderson
 Anderson Bros.
 Anderson Co.
 Anderson Sons
 Andersson, A.
 Andreas
 André
 Andreys
 Anelli
 Angerhöfer
 Apollo
 Arcade
 Archer
 Arion Pianofabrik
 Arirang
 Armstrong
 Army & Navy
 Arnold
 Artfield
 Artmann
 Asahi
 Ashenback
 Askolin
 Aspelin, O. W.
 Astin-Weight
 Astor
 Atlas
 Auburn
 Aucher
 August Förster
 Auto Piano Co.

B
 

 Babcock, Alpheus
 Babcock, Lewis & Alpheus
 Babcock, Appleton & Babcock
 Bach
 Bachman
 Bacon, Francis
 Baer, C.
 Bailey
 Baldorr & Sons
 Baldur
 Baldwin
 Baltica
 Bannerman
 Barber London
 Barker & Co
 Barnes
 Barrat & Robinson
 Barthol
 Bartlett
 Bauer
 Bauer, J.
 Baumbach
 Baumeister
 Baumgardt
 Baus
 Bay
 Beale
 Bechner
 Bechstein, C.
 Bechtel
 Becker
 Becker, J.
 Becker Bros.
 Behning & Klix
 Behning & Sons
 Behr Brothers Piano Company
 Bekker
 Belarus
 Belehredek
 Bell Piano & Organ Co.
 Bellak & Sons
 Bellman
 Bellmont
 Benjamin
 Benedict Brothers
 Benkert
 Bennington
 Bensted and sons, H.G.
 Bentley
 Berden
 Berdux
 Beregszaszy
 Berger
 Bergmann
 Bernhard Steiner
 Bernstein Wolf
 Berry
 Betting
 Beulhoff
 Biber
 Beyer-Rahnefeld
 Biddle
 Bieger
 Biese, W.
 Billberg
 Birke, Willy
 Birnbaum
 Bishop
 Bjur Bros.
 Blasius
 Blenheim
 Blondel, A.
 Blondel, G.
 Blüthner
 Boardman, Gray & Co.
 Bocage
 Bock & Hinrichsen
 Bogart
 Bogs & Voigt
 Bohemia
 Boisselot & Fils
 Böhme & Sohn
 Börs, Otto
 Bord, A.
 Borgato, Luigi  
 Bösendorfer
 Boston
 Boston Piano Co.
 Boyd
 Brackett & Robinson
 Brackett, J. W.
 Bradbury
 Bradbury, Wm. B.
 Bradford
 Brambach
 Brandtner, H. Rudolf
 Branston
 Brasil
 Brasted
 Breitkopf & Härtel
 Bremitz
 Brentwood
 Bretschneider, Alexander
 Breyer
 Briem
 Briggs
 Brinkerhoff
 Brinkmann
 Brinsmead, John
 Bristol
 Broadway
 Broadwood and Sons
 Broadwood White
 Brodmann
 Brooks
 Brother
 Brown & Allen
 Browning
 Bruckner
 Brunger
 Brunner
 Brødrene Hals Christiania
 Bulow
 Burg van den
 Burgasser
 Burgdorfer
 Burger & Jacobi AG
 Burgmuller
 Burling Mansfield
 Bush & Lane
 Bush & Gerts
 Butler Bros.
 Byelloruss

C

 C. Baer
 Cable, Hobart M.
 Cable Nelson
 Cable Piano Company
 Cäcilia
 Cahn & Cahn
 Calisia
 Cameo
 Cameron
 Camillo
 Cappelen
 Carl. Kierston
 Carlton
 Candice
 Carod
 Cauwenberghe
 Chaika
 Challen
 Casio
 Challenger
 Chappell & Co.
 Charles Stieff
 Chase, A.B.
 Chassaigne
 Chavanne
 Cherny
 Chickering, Jacob
 Chickering, Jonas
 Chickering & Mackays
 Chickering and Sons
 Chickering Bros.
 Chicago Cottage
 Christensen
 Christman
 Chu-Seng
 Clark Melville
 Classenti
 Classic
 Clement
 Clementi
 Christofori
 Chollard 
 Chollard & Chollard 
 Cline
 Cockuijt
 Collard & Collard
 Colby
 Colonial
 Cotto
 Conn
 Conover
 Conover Cable
 Consolat de Mar
 Continental
 Conway
 Cornish
 Cramer
 Crane & Sons, Ltd.
 Cristofori
 Crown
 Cuijpers, J.F.
 Cunningham Piano Company
 Currier & Gilbert
 Currier & Co.
 Currier Piano Co.
 Czapka & Sohn

D

 Daesung
 Daewoo
 Dale Forty
 Dalibor
 David à paris
 D'almaine
 Danemann
 Danemann, W
 Daniël
 Davenport & Treacy
 Debain et Cie
 De Blaise
 Delmar
 Dassel
 Decker Brothers
 Dengler
 D'este
 Diapason
 Dietmann
 Diederichs Freres
 Disklavier
 Dittrich
 Dobbert
 Does, van der
 Döhnert
 Doina
 Donath, Max
 Dörner
 Dörneberg
 Carl Dörr
 Doss, Robert
 Dominion Piano and Organ Co.
 Dochtermann piano
 Doutreligne Piano
 Drachman
 Dreinhöfer, Wilhelm
 Dreyer & Co.
 Driggs, Parmelee & Co.
 Driggs Patent Piano Co.
 Driggs & Tooker
 Duck-Son & Pinker
 Dulcette
 Dunham, John B.
 Dunham, John B. & Co.
 Dunham & Sons
 Duysen
 D.W. Karn
 Dresden

E

 Eastman
 Eavestaff
 Ebel & Sohn
 Ebel, Carl 
 Ecke, Carl
 Eckstein
 Ed. Westermayer
 Egtved
 Friedrich Ehrbar
 Eisenberg
 Ekström, Olof Berndt
 Elcké
 Elias
 Ellington
 Elysian
 Emerson
 Emmer, Wilhelm
 Erard & Cie, S.& P.
 Erard- London
 Erbe, J.
 Ernst Jacob, Mechanik Fabrik Berlin CO
 Erste Produktiv-Genossenschaft
 Ernst Chladni
 Essenfelder
 Essex
 Estey Piano Corp.
 Estonia
 Eterna
 Etyde
 Eungblut, Rogers
 Euphona 
 Europa
 Euterpe
 Evans
 Everett
 Evertides

F

 F.Dörner & sohn 
 Fabbrini 
 F.Bach 
 F.Rosener
 Albert Fahr
 Falcone
 Fandrich Piano
 Fandrich & Sons
 Farfisa
 Farrand
 Fayette S. Cable
 Fazer Musik
 Fazioli
 Feigl, Alois
 Fenner
 Feurich
 Fibich
 Fibiger
 Fiedler, Gustav
 Finger
 Fiona
 Fischer, Carl
 J&C Fischer
 Focké
 Focké, Georges
 Forenede
 Forrest
 Foster
 Förster & Co.
 Förster, August
 Francke
 French
 French Starck
 Franz Wolek in Wien
 Fritz Dobbert
 Fuchs
 Fuchs & Möhr
 Fuder, G.

G

 G. Ekström & Co. Pianofabrik
Gabler
 Gaveau
 Gebr. Perzina
 Gebruder Stingl
 Geissler, F.
 George Steck
 Gerard
 Gerhard Adam Wesel
 Gerbstädt
 Gerhard Adams
 Gerhard Heintzman
 Gerstenberger
 Gevaert
 Geyer
 Gilbert Hoffman
 Giles Pianos Ltd.
 Gillot-Straube
 Glos & Pflug, Wien
 Glass & Co.
 Glenz (Josef) Breslau
 Godfrey
 Goetze & Co.
 Goetze-Gross
 Gordon & Bailey 
 Gordon Laughead
 Gourlay
 R. Görs & Kallmann
 Görs & Spangenberg
 Gotha
 Gotzmann
 Graf, Conrad
 Graf, Hermann
 Graham & Co London
 Grand
 Grande
 Gratiae
 Grau, F.
 Grimm
 Grinnell Bros.
 Grotrian-Steinweg
 Grover
 Grunert
 Gulbransen
 Gunther, J.
 Gunther & Sohne
 Gustafson & Ljungqvist

H

 Haake, Karl
 Haddorff
 Hadley
 Haegele of Aalen
 Haessler
 Hagspiel
 Hahn, Alb.
 Hain, Stephan
 Haines Bros.
 Haileer
 Hailun
 Halle & 
 Hallet, Davis & Co.
 Hallett & Cumston
 Hallett, Russell
 Hals
 Hamburger
 Hamilton
 Hammond
 Hampton
 Hanlet
 Hannon Hall
 Hansen, A.
 Hansen, Julius
 Hillmann
 Hansmann, Gebr.
 Hardman
 Harimatis
 Harmsworth & Company
 Harold, F.E.
 Harrison, V. F.
 Hartge, Henry
 Hartmann, W.
 Harvard
 Harwood
 Hasche
 Hasselaar
 Hasseldieck, Dietrich
 Hasti Asghari
 Hauch, J.B.
 Hausmann
 Hautrive
 Hayelson
 Hayes, E. T. 
 Hayt, Babcock & Appleton
 Hayts, Babcock & Appleton
 Hazelton & Brother
 Hazelton Brothers
 Healy
 Hedke, Wilh.
 Hegeler
 Heiden, Carl von
 Heinisch
 Heintzman & Co.
 Heitzmann & Sohn
 Heller
 Hellas
 Hellström
 Helmholz
 Heppel & Theilig
 Hergens, A. G.
 Hermann
 Herrburger
 Herrmann, Alexander
 Herz, Henri
 Herz Neveu, Philippe
 Heyl, Gustav
 Hijz, Ernest
 Hillgärtner, Heinrich
 Hilton
 Hindsberg
 Hinze
 Hlucháň
 Hobart M. Cable
 Hoek
 Hoepfner
 Hoerr, Franz
 Hofbauer, Gustav 
 Hoffmann, August
 Hoffmann, Georg
 Hoffmann, W.
 Hoffmann & Kühne
 Hofmann
 Hofmann & Czerny
 Hofmann, Karl
 Hofmann & Scholz
 Hofmann & Schulze
 Hohner
 Hölling & Spangenberg
 Holzl & Heitzmann
 Hoff & Co.
 Hopkinson
 Hornung & Møller
 Hörügel
 Howard
 Howard Piano Co.
 HsingHai
 Hummel
 Hundt & Sohn
 Hupfeld
 Hupfer Pianos
 Humphrey, London
 Huntington
 Hyfte, van C.
 Hyundai

I

 Ibach, Rud.
 Irmler, J.G.

J

 J. Erbe Eisenach
 J. G. Irmler
 Jacob Bros.
 Jahn
 James & Holmstrom
 Janowsky, M.
 Janssen
 Jarret & Goudge
 Jasper
 Jaschinsky, A.
 Jefferson
 Jehle
 Jelmini
 Jewett, Boston
 John Raper co.
 Jong de
 Jørgensen, Brødr.
 J. Tresselt
 Julius Bach MFG
 Jurkat, C.
 Jayel

K
 

 Kadette
 Kadenza
 Kaim
 Kaim & Gunther
 Kaiser
 Kann, Georg
 Kappler
 Kaps, Ernst
 Kasselman
 Katzmarek & Co.
 Kawai Musical Instruments
 Keilberg
 Keislair
 Kemble
 Kenny & Sons
 Kent & Cooper
 Kessels
 Kester, Ludwig
 Keylard
 Kieselhorst
 Kilbourne
 Kimball
 Kingsburg
 Kingsbury
 Kirkman
 Kirschner
 Kisting
 Klavins
 Klein
 Klima
 Klingmann
 Kloppe, H.
 Knabe & Gaehle
 Knabe, Gaehle & Co.
 Knabe, Wm. & Co.
 Knabe Bros.
 Knake
 Knauer
 Knauss
 Knight
 Knöchel Ad.
 Knudsen, J.
 Knudsen & Sons
 Koch & Korselt
 Koch & Co.
 H. Kohl
 Kohler & Campbell
 Kort de
 Kraft, Aug.
 Krakauer Brothers
 Kramer
 Kranich & Bach
 Krasnii Oktyabr' (Leningrad)
 Krause, Max
 Krauss
 Krell & French
 Krell
 Kreuizbach
 Kreutzbach, Julius
 Kreutzer
 Kriebel
 Kriegelstein
 Kriegelstein & Arnaud
 Kriegelstein & Plantade
 Krumm
 Kuhla
 Kuhse, Johann
 Kunst
 Kunz
 Kupers
 K.Fenner
 Kurtzmann & Sons

L

 La Petite
 Labrousse
 Lager
 Lagonda
 Lagrima
 Lakeside
 Lambert
 Lancaster
 Lauberger & Gloss
 Laughead, Gordon
 Laurence & Nash
 Laurence & Sons, Alex
 Legnica
 Leguerinais
 Lehman
 Lehmann, Adolf
 Lehmann de Lehnsfeld
 Leichel
 Leijser
 Leipzig
 Lerpée, Carl 
 Lesage
 Leschen, Wilhelm
 Lester
 Leswein
 Leutke
 Lichtental
 Liederstrom
 Liehr
 Lieshout & Zonen, M. van
 Lichtenthal, Hermann
 Lighte, F. C.
 Lighte & Bradburys
 Lighte & Ernst
 Lighte & Newton
 Lighte, Newton & Bradburys
 Liljequist, Matthias
 Lincoln
 Lindbergh
 Lindeman, Wm.
 Lindeman & Sons
 Linden
 Lindholm
 Lindner
 Lindner & Sohn, I.P.
 Lindsay
 Linke
 Lipczinsky, Max
 Lipp
 Lippmann 
 Lirika
 Littmann
 Livingstone
 Lohmann Piano Co.
 Lorenz
 Love, Malcolm
 Lowrey
 Ludwig
 Luis Verdugo & Hijo
 Lummer, Wilh.
 Luner
 Lyon & Healy
 Lyra
 Lyrica

M

 Maeari-Hyundai
 Maetzke
 Mag
 Mage
 Magrini
 Mahler
 Maier,K.
 Malmsjö
 Mand
 Mann, Theodor
 Manner & Co.
 Manner & Gabler
 Mannhorg
 Mansfield
 Manthey
 Marion
 Maristany
 Martins & Ouvrier
 Markx
 Marschall & Mittauer
 Marshall & Rose
 Marshall & Wendell
 Mason & Hamlin
 Mason & Risch
 Mathuschek, F.
 Mathushek Piano Mfg. Co.
 Mathushek & Kinkeldey
 Mathushek & Kühner
 Mathushek & Son
 Matthaes
 Matz & Co.
 Mätzke, Ed.
 Max Horn Zwickau
 May
 McPhail, A. M.
 Mecklenburg
 Meister
 Meldorf
 Melford
 Melodic
 Melville Clark
 Menzel
 Mercedes
 Merkur
 Mes, A.
 Metropolitan
 Meyer, Conrad
 Meyer, Herman
 Michelle
 Mignon
 Mikula, Gebr.
 Miller, Henry F. Miller (Boston)
 Milton, (John)
 Minse
 Monington & Weston
 Moore & Moore
 Morley, Robert
 Morrison & Harrison
 Mörs
 Mozart piano company
 Müller
 Müller-Schiedmayer
 Mussard
 Muzelle
 Mühlbach, F.

N

 Nagel
 Nakamichi
 Natori
 Nehammer
 Nelson
 
 Neuburger, Adolf
 Neugebauer
 Neumann
 Neumeyer, Gebr.
 Neupert
 New Winsor
 Niederländer
 Niedermeyer
 Nieër
 Niemeyer
 Niendorf
 Nijmatten
 Nocturno
 Noeske
 Nordiska
 Nord Piano
 Normandie (NY)
 Nützmann, Adolf

O

 Offberg
 Omori
 Otto Bach
 Otto Meister

Oktava

P

 Packard
 Painter & Ewing
 Palatino
 Paling minor
 Pallik & Schicker
 Pallik & Stiasny
 Pape, Jean-Henri
 Pape fils (Frédéric-Eugène)
 Pappenberger
 Papps
 Parttart, Alois
 Paukert
 Paul Werner (Dresden)
 Pawlek, Josef
 Pearl River
 Peek and Son
 Pepper
 Period Piano Company
 Perzina, Gebr.
 Peterborgh
 Petrof
 Petrov
 Petzold
 Peukert
 Pfaffe, Julius
 Pfeiffer
 Pfeiffer, J.
 Philipps
 Phillip
 Phillips
 Piano Disc
 Pianova
 Picassi
 Pleyel
 Plymouth
 Poestkoke
 Pohlmann, Leonhard
 Pokorny
 Poletti & Tuinman
 Pons Gary
 Poole
 Pramberger
 Prein, Friedrich
 President
 Prestel
 Price & Teeple
 Probst, Georg
 Produktiv-G.,E.
 Proksch, A.
 Proskowec
 Protze
 Psalmist
 Purcell

Q

 Quandt
 Quispel

R

 Rachals
 Raehse-Repia
 Rameau
 Ramsberger
 Rathke, R.
 Rahmann
 Raudenbush & Sons
 Rauzer
 Ravenstein
 Ravenscroft
 Red October
 Regent
 Reichelt & Birnbaum
 Reid Sohn
 Reingardt, V. K.
 Reinhard
 Reinhold
 Reino Ikonen
 Reisbach
 Rekewitz, Wilh.
 Renn
 Repia
 Rhiendorf
 Richard Lipp & Sohn
 Richmann
 Ridgewood
 Rieger-Kloss
 Riese
 Riga
 Rijken
 Rijken & de Lange
 Rippen
 Ritmüller
 W. Ritmüller & Sohn
 Ritter
 Robinson
 Rogers
 Rogers, George
 Rohlfing
 Rohr, Alfred
 Roland
 Roller & Blanchet
 Roloff, H
 Römhildt
 Ronaldi
 Karl Rönisch
 Rordorf
 Rösch-Le Sage
 Rosenbach
 Rosenberg
 Rosenkranz
 Rösler
 G. Rösler
 Roth & Junius
 Roth Pianos
 Royale
 Royale-Classic
 Rubenstein
 Ruch
 Rud. Ibach Sohn
 Russell and Russell
 Russell, George
 Ruyter
 R. Vogel
 Robinson

S

 Sabel
 Sagenhaft
 Sakura
 Samaniego
 Sames, William
 Samick
 Sandbergen
 Sängler & Sohne
 Sassmann
 Saturn
 Sauter
 Schaaf & Co.
 Schaaf, Hermann
 Schadhauser, Johann
 Schafer & Sons
 Schanz
 Scharf & Hauk
 Scheel, Carl
 Schellenkens, G.
 Schell, Lothar
 Schemelli & Co.
 Schiedmayer, J.& P.
 Schiedmayer
 Schiller
 Schilling, Fr.
 Schimmel
 Schindhelm
 Schindler
 Schirmer & Son
 Schlögl
 Schmidt
 Schmidt-Flohr
 Schmidt Pianos
 Schmitz
 Schnell, R.A.
 Scholze
 Schramm&Sons
 Schröder, C.M.
 Schroeder
 Schröther
 Schruder
 Schubert
 Schuerman
 Schultz & Sons
 Schulze & Sohn
 Schulze & Pollmann
 Schumann
 Schuppe & Neumann
 Schütz & Co.
 Schütze
 Schuetze & Ludolff
 Schwechten, G.
 Schweighofer
 Schweizerstein
 Schwester
 Seeger
 Seidel, Rob
 Seidel & Sohn
 Seiler, Ed.
 Seiler, Max
 Sejung Piano Co.
 Settergren
 Settergren Piano Co.
 Seuffert
 Sherlock - Manning
 Sherman, Clay
 Shima-Jehle
 Shimler
 Shigeru
 Shigeru Kawai
 Shoninger
 Shorewood
 Siegel, Rudolf
 Siewert
 Silbermann
 Singer
 Skop
 Silvia
 Smart, Charles
 Smidt & Wegener
 Snel
 Sohmer & Co.
 Sojin
 Solton
 Sommerfeld
 Sonor
 Sonore
 Soph, Joseph
 Sopnnagel
 Soward
 Spencer
 Spencer & Murdoch
 Squire
 Squire and Longson
 Standaart
 Stapel
 Starck
 Starckette & Kenmore
 Starr Piano Co.
 Staub & Co.
 Staub, J.
 Steck
 Steck, George
 Steger & Sons
 Steigerman
 Stein
 Steinbach
 Steinbach, Alex
 Steinberg
 Steinberg, Gerh.
 Steinberg, Wilh
 Steiner, B.
 Steiner, Bernhard
 Steingraeber & Söhne
 Steinhoven
 Steinmann, Wilh.
 Steinmayer 
 Steinthal, L.
 Steinway & Sons
 Steinway Haus
 Stelzhammer
 Stenger
 Sterling
 Stichel, F.
 Stingl, Gebr.
 Stingl, Ignaz
 Stöcker, Theodor
 Stockholm
 Stoddart
 Story & Clark
 Straube
 Strauss
 Streicher
 Strindberg
 Strohmenger & Sons
 Strothier
 Stroud
 Stuart and Sons
 Stuyvesant
 Stultz
 Sturn
 Suzuki
 Svahnquist
 Svenska

T

 Tallone
 Tamta
 Taubert
 Tchaikovsky
 Temple
 Tetsch & May
 Thalèn
 Thayer
 Theilig, Rich.
 Thein
 Therson
 Th. Mann & Co.
 Thomas & Avarsea
 Thuringer
 Tischner, J. A.
 Thürmer, Ferd.
 Tokai
 Tokiwa
 Tolkien
 tonk
 Tormin, C.
 Toyo
 Toyo Appolo
 Trautwein
 Trübger, Emil
 Tschaika
 Tuch & Geyer

U

 Uebel & Lechleiter
 Ühlmann
 Ukraina
 United Piano Makers, New York
 Urbas, Johann
 Urbas & Kuhne
 Urbas & Reishauer
 Urk & Sons

V

 Van Hyfte
 Van der Does
 Van Lieshout
 Van Veen J.
 Van Veen W.
 Verkooij
 Vermy
 Vertigrand
 Victor W.H Paling & Co
 Vijgeboom Joh.
 Vijgeboom Johs.
 Van Vloten
 Vose & Sons
 Vogel & Co.
 Vogel, Robert
 Vogel & Sohn
 Vogeler & Co.
 Voigt, Adolf Ernst
 Volkening
 Vollmer
 Vough

W

 Waddington
 Wagner
 Wagener & Co, Berlin
 Waldhäusl, Robert
 Waldstein
 Wallace Ash
 Wallace Pianoforte Co.
 Walsmann M.
 Walter, Charles R.
 Waltham Piano Co.
 Warfield
 Wasniczek
 Waters, Horace
 Watlen, John
 Weaver
 Weber
 Webster
 Wegman
 Weidenslaufer
 Weidig, C.
 Weihenmeyer & Co.
 Weinbach
 Weinstein and Sons
 Weiss
 Weissbrod
 Wellington
 Welmar U.K. 
 Welzel P.F.
 Wendl & Lung
 Werch, Lothar
 Werner, F.W.
 Werner, Hans
 Wertheim
 Westbrook
 Westerlund
 Wetzel
 Whelpdale
 Whitmore
 Whitney
 Whittaker
 Wieck
 Wieler
 Wilh Steinberg
 Wilhelm Spaethe 
 Wilkinson, George
 Wilkinson & Wornum
 William Wallace Kimball
 Williams & Son, R.S.
 Williams Piano Co.
 Williamson
 Willermann
 Willis & Co.
 Wilson
 Winchester
 Windhofer, Rudolf
 Windover 
 Windsor
 Winkelmann & Co.
 Winkler, Paul
 Winter && Co.
 Wirth, Johann
 Wittmayer
 Witton and Witton
 Wohlfahrt
 Wolfframm
 Wolkenhauer
 Woodchester
 Wornum, Robert
 Wornum, Robt. & Sons
 Wurlitzer
 W. P. Emerson Piano Co.
 W.Naessens
 Wyman

X

 Xinghai Beijing Piano Co.

Y

 Yamaha
 Young Chang
 Yangtze River

Z

 Zahl, Georg
 Zeitter & Winkelmann
 Zender, Sydney
 Zimmermann
 Zwang
 Zwicki

• Zapka

See also

 List of piano manufacturers
 Innovations in the piano
 Pedal piano
 Piano acoustics
 Piano key frequencies (in equal temperament)
 Piano roll
 Piano tuning
 Player piano
 Prepared piano
 Social history of the piano
 String piano
 Tangent piano

References

Bibliography
 Larry Fine; The Piano Book: Buying & Owning a New or Used Piano (Annual Supplement to the Piano Book); Brookside Press; 2005; 

 
piano
Piano